Quinolizidine (norlupinane, octahydro-2H-quinolizine) is a nitrogen-containing heterocyclic compound. Some alkaloids (e.g. cytisine and sparteine) are derivatives of quinolizidine.

Quinolizidine alkaloids 

Quinolizidine alkaloids, such as nupharine and related chemicals, can be found in Nymphaea lotus and other species in the family Nymphaeaceae. Quinolizidine alkaloids are also found in genistoid legumes.

External links

 Synthesis: